Michael Locher (born 7 January 1969), also known as Vorphalack or simply Vorph, is a Swiss musician who provides vocals and is a guitarist for the industrial/black metal band Samael.

Biography 
Locher was born in Sion. He co-founded Samael in 1987 with his brother Alexandre (also known as "Xytras" or "Xy") on drums. Locher's musical influences include Celtic Frost, Slayer, Iron Maiden, Motörhead, Venom, Bathory and early Possessed. He particularly points to Bathory as a source of inspiration for vocals:

His guitar is a customized ESP Viper with Ernie Ball guitar strings, Boss GT pro, Mesa Boogie Dual Rectifier. During Samael's black metal period, Vorph (then called Vorphalack) played a Jackson King V guitar too. During the Passage era Vorph played a black Jackson Kelly.

Vorph stated in an interview with Dutch webzine Lords of Metal that he does not eat junk food and that he is a vegetarian.

References

External links 

Swiss heavy metal musicians
Living people
1969 births
People from Sion, Switzerland